The 2nd CC.NN. Division "28 Ottobre" was an Italian CC.NN. (Blackshirts militia) division raised on 10 May 1935 for the Second Italo-Ethiopian War against Ethiopia. The name "28 Ottobre" ("28 October") was chosen to commemorate the Fascist March on Rome on 28 October 1922. The division took part in the Italian invasion of Egypt and was destroyed during the Battle of Bardia in January 1941.

History 
The division was one of six CC.NN. divisions raised in summer 1935 in preparation for the Second Italo-Ethiopian War. Its members were volunteers from the various armed militias of the National Fascist Party's paramilitary wing and came from four regions: the 114th and 116th CC.NN. legions from Lombardy, the 180th CC.NN. Legion from the Emilia-Romagna, Lombardy, and Piedmont, and the II CC.NN. Machine Gun Battalion from Liguria.

Second Italo-Ethiopian War 
The division assembled in Italian Eritrea on 18 September 1935 and moved to Senafe on the border with Ethiopia. The division participated in the Second Battle of Tembien. After the war the division was repatriated and then disbanded.

World War II 
The division was reformed in Naples in 1939 and sent with three other CC.NN. divisions to Italian Libya. The division took part in the invasion of Egypt in September 1940, reaching Sallum in Egypt by October. Heavily invested by British forces during Operation Compass the division retreated to Bardia, where it was encircled with other Italian units. After a short siege the division was destroyed during the Battle of Bardia on 3–5 January 1941.

Organization

1935 

Below follows the division's organization during the Second Italo-Ethiopian War and the cities, in which its CC.NN. battalions and companies/batteries were raised.

 2nd CC.NN. Division "28 Ottobre"
 114th CC.NN. Legion "Garibaldina", in Bergamo
 Command Company
 CXIV CC.NN. Battalion, in Bergamo
 CXV CC.NN. Battalion, in Brescia
 114th CC.NN. Machine Gun Company, in Milan, Lodi and Pavia
 114th CC.NN. Artillery Battery, Piacenza (65/17 infantry support guns)
 116th CC.NN. Legion "Alpina", in Como
 Command Company
 CXVI CC.NN. Battalion, in Como
 CXXV CC.NN. Battalion, in Brescia and Monza
 116th CC.NN. Machine Gun Company, in Como and Varese
 116th CC.NN. Artillery Battery, Milan (65/17 infantry support guns)
 180th CC.NN. Legion "Alessandro Farnese", in Parma
 Command Company
 CLXXIV CC.NN. Battalion, in Fidenza
 CLXXX CC.NN. Battalion, in Parma
 180th CC.NN. Machine Gun Company, in Cremona and Casalmaggiore
 180th CC.NN. Artillery Battery, in Alessandria and Tortona (65/17 infantry support guns) 
 II CC.NN. Machine Gun Battalion, in Genova and Savona
 II Artillery Group (65/17 infantry support guns, Royal Italian Army)
 II Mixed Transport Unit (Royal Italian Army)
 II Supply Unit (Royal Italian Army)
 2x CC.NN. replacement battalions
 2nd Special Engineer Company (Mixed CC.NN. and Royal Italian Army)
 2nd Medical Section (Royal Italian Army)
 2nd Logistic Section (Royal Italian Army)
 2nd Carabinieri Section

The supply unit had 1,600 mules and the mixed transport unit 80 light trucks. The division engaged in war crimes in Ethiopia during the Second Italo-Ethiopian War. The CXXV CC.NN. Battalion left a monumental stone' in Dogu'a Tembien, a metres-wide phonolite with inscriptions. It is located on top of the Dabba Selama mountain, and was carved by soldiers that participated in the First Battle of Tembien.

1940 
Below follows the division's organization at the start of the Italian invasion of Egypt and the cities, in which its CC.NN. battalions were raised:

  2nd CC.NN. Division "28 Ottobre"
 231st CC.NN. Legion, in Sulmona
 Command Company
 CXXXI CC.NN. Battalion, in Sulmona
 CXXXII CC.NN. Battalion, in Avezzano
 CXXXV CC.NN. Battalion, in Teramo
 231st CC.NN. Machine Gun Company
 238th CC.NN. Legion, in Naples
 Command Company
 CXXXVIII CC.NN. Battalion, in Naples
 CXL CC.NN. Battalion, in Salerno
 CXLV CC.NN. Battalion, in Castellammare di Stabia
 238th CC.NN. Machine Gun Company
 202nd Motorized Artillery Regiment (Royal Italian Army)
 Command Unit
 I Group (100/17 howitzers)
 II Group (75/27 field guns)
 III Group (75/27 field guns)
 2x Anti-aircraft batteries (20/65 Mod. 35 anti-aircraft guns)
 Ammunition and Supply Unit
 CCII Machine Gun Battalion (Royal Italian Army)
 CCII Mixed Engineer Battalion (Royal Italian Army)
 Command Platoon
 1x Engineer Company
 1x Telegraph and Radio Operators Company
 1x Searchlight Section
 202nd CC.NN. Anti-tank Company (47/32 anti-tank guns)
 202nd CC.NN. Support Weapons Battery (65/17 infantry support guns)
 202nd CC.NN. Mortar Company (81mm Mod. 35 mortars)
 202nd Transport Section (Royal Italian Army)
 202nd Supply Section (Royal Italian Army)
 202nd Medical Section (Royal Italian Army)
 3x Field hospitals
 1x Surgical Unit
 703rd Carabinieri Section
 704th Carabinieri Section
 302nd Field Post Office

Attached during the Battle of Sollum:
 XX Tank Battalion "L" (L3/33 and L3/35 tankettes, Royal Italian Army)

Commanding officers 
During the Second Italo-Ethiopian War:

 Generale di Divisione Umberto Somma (1 May 1935 – 1 September 1936)

During the Italian invasion of Egypt:

 Generale di Divisione Francesco Argentino (1939 – 5 January 1941, POW)

References

Sources 
 
 Madej, W.,V., Italian Army Order of Battle, 1939–1943,1981,Allentown, PA.
 Madej, W.,V., Italian Army Order of Battle: 1940–44, 1990, Allentown, PA.

Blackshirt divisions of Italy
Divisions of Italy in World War II
Divisions of Italy of the Second Italo-Ethiopian War